The 1999–2000 Florida Panthers season was their seventh season in the National Hockey League.

Off-season

Regular season

Final standings

Schedule and results

Playoffs
The Panthers made the Stanley Cup playoffs for the first time since 1997. As the fifth seed in the Eastern Conference, they played the fourth-seeded New Jersey Devils. However, the Panthers were eliminated in a four-game sweep. The Devils' sweep over the Panthers began a 12-year drought where the Florida team never made the playoffs. The Panthers would reenter the playoffs in 2012 after winning the Southeast Division title.

Player statistics

Awards and records

Transactions

Draft picks
Florida's draft picks at the 1999 NHL Entry Draft held at the FleetCenter in Boston, Massachusetts.

Farm teams
Louisville Panthers

See also
1999–2000 NHL season

References
 

Flo
Flo
Florida Panthers seasons
Florida Panthers
Florida Panthers